Ramos Arizpe is a city and seat of the surrounding municipality of the same name in the Mexican state of Coahuila. Ramos Arizpe is located 11 km from the state capital of Saltillo. It is part of the Saltillo metropolitan area. The city reported a population of 48,228 in the 2005 census; the municipality had a population of 56,708. Its area is 5,306.6 km2 (2,048.9 sq mi).

Ramos Arizpe was established originally in 1577 as Valle de las Labores, a name chosen as the soil was conducive to agriculture.

History
In the year 1606 the town was renamed Valle de San Nicolás de la Capellanía, because Spanish missionaries had taken there a sacred image of Saint Nicholas of Tolentino.

It is now a major industrial center, founded in 1974, featuring many automotive industrial parks. Several major companies have large operations in Ramos Arizpe or vicinity, such the General Motors Ramos Arizpe Assembly plant (Home of the Chevy C2, Pontiac Aztek, Buick Rendezvous, Saturn Vue, Cadillac SRX, Saab 9-4X and HHR), Chrysler Saltillo Engine Plant (Home of the 5.7L V8 HEMI engine) and other suppliers such as Magna, Stabilus, ZF Sachs and Macimex. As of 2016 the plant produces about one third of the firm's full-sized pickups.

Plan de Guadalupe International Airport serving Saltillo and Ramos Arizpe (Iata: SLW) is located there.

Climate
Winters are mild with warm temperatures during the day and cold nights. On average, temperatures drop below freezing on 18 days per year, which can occur in the months November to April. Occasionally, it can receive snowfall. Precipitation is low during the winter months and many days are clear and sunny, averaging 20-22 clear days from December to March.

Temperatures frequently exceed  and occasionally  during the summer months. Most of the precipitation that Ramos Arizpe receives falls during the summer months. On average, Ramoz Arizpe receives  of precipitation per year and there are 37 days with measureable precipitation.

Landmarks
Historical landmarks are Don Miguel Ramos Arizpe's house, father of Mexican federalism, Hacienda Santa María built in 1721, where Fr. Miguel Hidalgo conducted his final mass, and Hacienda de Guadalupe, where the Plan de Guadalupe was signed during the Mexican Revolution in 1913.

References

Link to tables of population data from Census of 2005 INEGI: Instituto Nacional de Estadística, Geografía e Informática
Chihuahua Enciclopedia de los Municipios de México

External links

Ayuntamiento de Ramos Arizpe Official website

Populated places in Coahuila
Populated places established in 1577